Achillea arabica is a species of flowering plant belonging to the family Asteraceae. It is native to parts of the Middle East, Western Asia, Southern Russia and Bulgaria.

References

arabica
Plants described in 1866
Flora of Asia
Flora of Europe